Toofan Singh is a 2017 Punjabi film directed by Baghal Singh with a release date of 4 August 2017 at Australia and UK. This movie is about the biography of Sikh Militant fighter Toofan Singh.

The Indian Central Board of Film Certification banned the movie in 2016. The movie was released internationally in 2017.

Cast
Ranjit Bawa as Toofan Singh
Daman Singh as Gurbaz Singh junior Toofan Singh
Sunita Dheer as Toofan Singh's mother
Sukhvir Singh as Toofan Singh's father
Shefali Sharma as Sukhjeet Kaur
Narinder Nina as Bhai Avtar Singh Brahma
Prince Kanwaljit Singh as Chandi Ram
Ramniq Sandhu as Haryanvi Lady Sarpanch
Jarnail Singh as Kashmir Singh
Deepraj Rana as CRPF officer
Sardar Sohi as Sewa Singh Police officer
Gurmeet Sajjan as Gurmail Singh Police officer
Gagneet Singh Makhan as School master
Yashpal Sharma as Arvind Ram (SSP)
Avtar Gill as KPS Gill
Raza Murad as Home Minister
Mangal Dhillon as Lakha
Satinder Kaur as Harbans Kaur Bhainji

References

External links 
 

Insurgency in Punjab in fiction
Punjabi-language Indian films
2010s Punjabi-language films
2017 films
Fictional portrayals of the Punjab Police (India)